Hutton is an unincorporated community in northern Prairie Creek Township, Vigo County, in the U.S. state of Indiana.

It is part of the Terre Haute metropolitan area.

History
Hutton was founded in 1833, and was named after the Hutton family of settlers. A post office was established at Hutton in 1889, and remained in operation until it was discontinued in 1906.

Geography

References

Unincorporated communities in Indiana
Unincorporated communities in Vigo County, Indiana
Terre Haute metropolitan area